Frederick John Kinghorn (1883–1971), A pioneer rugby league footballer, Kinghorn played for the Eastern Suburbs club in the New South Wales Rugby League competition.

Biography

Kinghorn who played 41 matches for  Eastern Suburbs side was a member of the club's first premiership winning sides in the years 1911, 1912 and 1913. Kinghorn was also a member of Easts City Cup winning side of  1914.

Following his retirement from the game Fred Kinghorn became a vice president of the Eastern Suburbs club in 1935.

Kinghorn died in 1971, aged 88.

References

The Encyclopedia Of Rugby League; Alan Whiticker & Glen Hudson

Australian rugby league players
Sydney Roosters players
1971 deaths
1883 births
Rugby league players from Orange, New South Wales
Rugby league fullbacks